Stenoptilia molleti is a moth of the family Pterophoridae. It is found in Pakistan.

References

Moths described in 1991
molleti
Moths of Asia